Rajčani is a village in the Kočani region of North Macedonia.

According to the 2002 census, there are 33 inhabitants.

Historical Significance 
On 27 April 1905, near the village, in the area of Svilanovo, Nikola Karev was killed while fighting with the Ottoman Turks. He was president of Krusevo Republic, which according to Bulgarian and Macedonian historiographies was the first modern-day republic in the Balkans.

References 

Villages in Kočani Municipality